William Thomas Stewart (October 18, 1853 – August 21, 1935) was mayor of Kanab, Utah, U.S. 1889–91, and a Representative to the Utah Territorial Legislature in 1887 and 1889.

The son of Levi Stewart and Margery (Wilkerson) Stewart, he was born and raised in Salt Lake City, Utah Territory.  He was a member of the Church of Jesus Christ of Latter-day Saints.  He moved to Kanab, Utah in 1870 when his father was called by Brigham Young to create a new settlement there.  A few months later his mother and several of his siblings were killed in a fire.

He married Rachel Tamar Hamblin, daughter of Jacob Hamblin, in 1873.

He became a polygamist in 1879 when he married Fannie Maria Little.  He took a third wife, Mary Udall in 1880.  She was the sister of David King Udall who was already married to William's sister Eliza Stewart.

In 1887 and 1889 he was elected to the Utah Territorial Legislature, and in 1889 he was also elected mayor of Kanab.

In 1901 he was called by the Church of Jesus Christ of Latter-day Saints to help settle Alamo, Nevada.

He died in Alamo in 1935.

See also
Udall family (political family)

External links
Extended biography of William Stewart

1853 births
1935 deaths
Mayors of places in Utah
People from Lincoln County, Nevada
Members of the Utah Territorial Legislature
19th-century American politicians
Udall family
American Latter Day Saints
People from Kanab, Utah
Politicians from Salt Lake City